Dimethoxymethane, also called methylal, is a colorless flammable liquid with a low boiling point, low viscosity and excellent dissolving power. It has a chloroform-like odor and a pungent taste.  It is the dimethyl acetal of formaldehyde. Dimethoxymethane is soluble in three parts water and miscible with most common organic solvents.

Synthesis and structure
It can be manufactured by oxidation of methanol or by the reaction of formaldehyde with methanol.  In aqueous acid, it is hydrolyzed back to formaldehyde and methanol.

Due to the anomeric effect, dimethoxymethane has a preference toward the gauche conformation with respect to each of the C–O bonds, instead of the anti conformation. Since there are two  C–O bonds, the most stable conformation is gauche-gauche, which is around 7 kcal/mol more stable than the anti-anti conformation, while the gauche-anti and anti-gauche are intermediate in energy. Since it is one of the smallest molecules exhibiting this effect, which has great interest in carbohydrate chemistry, dimethoxymethane is often used for theoretical studies of the anomeric effect.

Applications
Industrially, it is primarily used as a solvent and in the manufacture of perfumes, resins, adhesives, paint strippers and protective coatings. Another application is as a gasoline-additive for increasing octane number. Dimethoxymethane can also be used for blending with diesel.

Reagent in organic synthesis
Another useful application of dimethoxymethane is to protect alcohols with a methoxymethyl (MOM) ether in organic synthesis. This can be done using phosphorus pentoxide in dry dichloromethane or chloroform. This is a preferred method to using chloromethyl methyl ether (MOMCl). Alternatively, MOMCl can be prepared as a solution in a methyl ester solvent by reacting dimethoxymethane and an acyl chloride in the presence of a Lewis acid catalyst like zinc bromide:

MeOCH2OMe + RC(=O)Cl → MeOCH2Cl + RC(=O)(OMe)).

The solution of the reagent can be used directly without purification, minimizing contact with the carcinogenic chloromethyl methyl ether.  Unlike the classical procedure, which uses formaldehyde and hydrogen chloride as starting materials, the highly carcinogenic side product bis(chloromethyl) ether is not generated.

References

External links
 

Ether solvents
Formals
Methoxy compounds